Race to the Finish? The Nuclear Stakes is a book by Irish author Dervla Murphy. The book was first published in 1981. Like Murphy's other earlier works, it was published by Jock Murray of the John Murray publishing house.

Race to the Finish? is about nuclear power and the arms industry. Murphy speaks out against them, and credits the book as a turning point that led her to write more about political issues. In 1979, she stayed with friends near Three Mile Island, after America’s worst nuclear accident. From then most of her books have been what she has called “mongrels”, mixing travel with considerations of social, political and ethical problems.

A review in the Library Journal states

References

External links
 

1981 non-fiction books
John Murray (publishing house) books
Books by Dervla Murphy